Berg is a sub-municipality of Kampenhout in the province Flemish Brabant. It is the second-largest borough in terms of both area and population (after Kampenhout). South of Berg is the nature reserve "Torfbroek."'

Toponymy 
Berg owes its name to the fact that the church is located on a small hill (about 26 meters above sea level). In the past, this church could be seen from quite a distance, because there were few other buildings except a few farms.

History 
Plane crash in Berg-Kampenhout in 1961: Sabena Flight 548 in the southwest of the sub municipality, near the border with Steenokkerzeel

Famous citizens 
born or resident:
Willem Eekelers, politician, editor, syndicalist
Raymond Impanis, cyclist

References 

Populated places in Flemish Brabant